Nals is a municipality in northern Italy.

NALS may refer to:
Native American Literature Symposium
National Approved Letting Scheme
National Association of Legal Professionals (formerly National Association of Legal Secretaries - kept acronym)
Neonatal Advanced Life Support
North American Leaders' Summit